Herpetogramma vacheri is a moth in the family Crambidae. It was described by Christian Guillermet in 2008. It is found on Réunion.

References

Moths described in 2008
Herpetogramma
Moths of Africa